NRK may refer to:
 NRK (gene)
 Norsk rikskringkasting, the Norwegian Broadcasting Corporation
 NRK, identifier for Newark Amtrak station, Delaware, US
 NRK, IATA airport code for Norrköping Airport, Sweden
 NRK, London Stock Exchange identifier UK bank Northern Rock
 KNRK, radio station rebranded 94-7 NRK, Portland, Oregon, US